Marquis Ferrod Jackson (born January 11, 1990) is a Canadian football defensive lineman for the BC Lions of the Canadian Football League (CFL). He played college football at Portland State. Jackson signed with the Minnesota Vikings as an undrafted free agent in 2013.

College

Texas Southern
Jackson was selected to the first-team All-Southwest Athletic Conference in 2010 and 2011. Also Jackson was a member of the 2010 SWAC Champion team while at Texas Southern. Jackson made 111 tackles, 13 sacks and forced five fumbles while at Texas Southern University. He was initiated into the Tau Epsilon Chapter of Omega Psi Phi while at Texas Southern.

Professional career

Minnesota Vikings
In May 2013, Jackson signed with the Minnesota Vikings as an undrafted free agent following the 2013 NFL Draft. In August 2013, Jackson was released.

Portland Thunder
In 2014, Jackson signed with Portland Thunder of the Arena Football League.

Chicago Bears
On June 16, 2016, Jackson signed a one-year deal with the Chicago Bears. On August 4, 2016, Jackson was waived by the Bears.

BC Lions
Jackson signed with the BC Lions on February 21, 2017.

Personal life
His twin brother, Malik, is currently a free agent .

References

External links
 Arena Football bio
 Portland State bio
 Texas Southern bio
 Minnesota Vikings bio

1990 births
Living people
American football defensive ends
Canadian football defensive linemen
American players of Canadian football
Portland Thunder players
Chicago Bears players
Minnesota Vikings players
BC Lions players
Players of American football from Los Angeles
Birmingham High School alumni
Players of Canadian football from Los Angeles